Rodolphe Roche  (born 14 June 1979) is a French former professional football who played as a goalkeeper. During his 18-year playing career, he represented Montluçon, Châteauroux, Le Mans, Saint-Louis Neuweg, Chamois Niortais and Châteauroux.

Career statistics

References

1979 births
Living people
People from Montluçon
French footballers
Association football goalkeepers
Montluçon Football players
LB Châteauroux players
Le Mans FC players
FC Saint-Louis Neuweg players
Chamois Niortais F.C. players
Ligue 1 players
Ligue 2 players
Championnat National players
Sportspeople from Allier
Footballers from Auvergne-Rhône-Alpes